Tarsozeuzera livingstoni is a moth in the family Cossidae. It was described by Yakovlev in 2006. It is found in Cameroon, the Republic of Congo, Ivory Coast, Malawi and Tanzania.

The length of the forewings is 19–22 mm. There is a reticulate pattern along the outer and hind margins of the forewings. There is also a longitudinal greyish stripe in the discal and radial areas. The hindwings are semitransparent, suffused with greyish
scales.

Etymology
The species is named in honour of Dr. Livingston.

References

Natural History Museum Lepidoptera generic names catalog

Zeuzerinae
Moths described in 2006